The Office of City Engineer of Providence, Rhode Island is an office that is credited with the design of a number of notable public works.

Its Chemical Building, for example, was built in 1900 and displays Late Victorian architecture.

A number of its works are listed on the National Register of Historic Places.

Works
Its works, all in Providence, include:
Chemical Building, Fields Point Sewage Treatment Plant, Ernest St. at Fields Point,  (Office of City Engineer,Providence), NRHP-listed
Ernest Street Sewage Pumping Station, Ernest and Ellis Sts., (Office of City Engineer,Providence), NRHP-listed
Reservoir Avenue Sewage Pumping Station, Reservoir and Pontiac Aves., (Office of City Engineer,Providence), NRHP-listed
Return Sludge Pumping Station, Fields Point Sewage Treatment Plant, Ernest St.,  (Office of City Engineer,Providence), NRHP-listed
Sludge Press House, Fields Point Sewage Treatment Plant, Ernest St. at Fields Point,  (Office of City Engineer,Providence), NRHP-listed 
Washington Park Sewage Pumping Station, Shipyard St., (Office of City Engineer,Providence), NRHP-listed

References

Government of Providence, Rhode Island